Almanza is a municipality located in the province of León, Castile and León, Spain. According to the 2009 census (INE), the municipality has a population of 609 inhabitants.

Villages
Almanza
Cabrera de Almanza
 Calaveras de Abajo
 Calaveras de Arriba
Canalejas
 Castromudarra
 Espinosa de Almanza
 La Vega de Almanza
 Villaverde de Arcayos

See also
Tierra de Campos
Almansa in the province of Albacete

References

External links
La provincia de León y sus comarcas; Cea-Campos

Municipalities in the Province of León